Hooky / Hookey / Hookie may refer to the following:

 To "play hooky", a slang term, particularly in North America, for committing truancy
 Hooky (webcomic), a webtoon by Spanish author Míriam Bonastre Tur
 Hooky (nickname), a list of people and one fictional character
 Hookey (surname), a list of people
 "Hooky", a season 1 episode of the animated television show SpongeBob SquarePants
 Hooky, nickname of Peter Hook, former Joy Division and New Order bassist